Robert A. "Rob" Strickland is a technology and mobile executive, currently a co-founder and investor of The Digital Nexus, a professional management consulting firm.

Career highlights
Frank Batten and Jeffrey L. Cruikshank, in their book “The Weather Channel: the improbable rise of a media phenomenon” (Harvard Business Press; 1st edition (May 2, 2002) p. 206) referred to Rob's hire as a key event in determining the strategy and subsequent success of The Weather Channel as a major source of weather information on the Internet:

“we hired [in January 1998] a chief information officer, Rob Strickland, who initiated a serious and successful push into the digital age.”

At Echostar, Rob was involved in helping to automate call centers by creating a voice recognition system. In addition, Rob renegotiated a large billing contract with CSG, Inc. for Echostar.

While at T-Mobile USA, Rob led the effort to use service-oriented architecture which enabled T-Mobile USA to revamp its customer service experience. The project, dubbed “OpenSpan,” provided T-Mobile USA's customer service representatives with one view of all the underlying systems that are used to complete a transaction. With a convenient search feature, call center employees significantly improved the speed of access of information that they needed, without unnecessarily lengthening a service call. Call response times were reduced by 13.75 seconds across call centers, while new representatives trained on the integrated system had a call response time of up to 22 seconds better than reps trained on the previous system. The results were expected to save $260 million annually. As a consequence of this project, Rob and the T-Mobile USA IT department were honored with a CIO 100 Award in 2009.

Robert Strickland, CIO of T-Mobile, which uses SAP and Business Objects applications and NetWeaver middleware, sees promise in the model. "If you can have a universal SOA layer that allows you to connect everyone to that common bus and defines how you expose those services," Strickland said, "that may ultimately give us the best flexibility. It would let us order things à la carte and connect them seamlessly." He continued, "such cloud computing efforts are becoming more practical as broadband speed and connectivity options improve."

Awards
 CIO 100 Award, 2009.
 Computerworld CIO 100 Premier honoree, 2008.
 Information Week Top 500, ranked #16, 2007. (Link Missing now)
 CIO 100 Award, 2006.
 Bachelor of Arts degree in mathematics from Brandeis University.

References

American businesspeople
Living people
Chief information officers
Year of birth missing (living people)